Dina Maksutova (born 7 December 1969) is a Kyrgyzstan judoka. She competed in the women's half-lightweight event at the 1992 Summer Olympics.

References

1969 births
Living people
Soviet female judoka
Olympic judoka of the Unified Team
Judoka at the 1992 Summer Olympics
Place of birth missing (living people)